The Mark-12 nuclear bomb was a lightweight nuclear bomb designed and manufactured by the United States which was built starting in 1954 and which saw service from then until 1962.

The Mark-12 was notable for being significantly smaller in both size and weight compared to prior implosion-type nuclear weapons. For example, the overall diameter was only , compared to the immediately prior Mark-7 which had a  diameter, and the volume of the implosion assembly was only 40% the size of the Mark-7's.

There was a planned W-12 warhead variant which would have been used with the RIM-8 Talos missile, but it was cancelled prior to introduction into service.

Specifications

Features
The Mark-12 has been speculated to have been the first deployed nuclear weapon to have used beryllium as a reflector-tamper inside the implosion assembly (see nuclear weapon design). It is believed to have used a spherical implosion assembly, levitated pit, and 92-point detonation.

In popular culture
Though the weapon went out of service in 1962, it resurfaced in a fictional role in Tom Clancy's 1991 book The Sum of All Fears and the 2002 film, where the plot included an Israeli copy of the Mark-12 being lost by accident in 1973 during the Yom Kippur War in southern Syria near the Golan Heights, and then recovered by a terrorist organization.

See also
 Nuclear weapon design
 Mark 7 nuclear bomb
 The Sum of All Fears
 The Sum of All Fears (film)

References

External links
 allbombs.html list at nuclearweaponarchive.org
 Historical nuclear bombs list at globalsecurity.org

Cold War aerial bombs of the United States
Nuclear bombs of the United States
Military equipment introduced in the 1950s